North Isis is a rural locality in the Bundaberg Region, Queensland, Australia. In the  North Isis had a population of 533 people.

Geography 
The Bruce Highway touches the south-west boundary of North Isis (but does not enter it). At this point, the Isis Highway splits off and passes through the south-west corner of the locality and then forms the western boundary of the locality.

The locality is predominantly used for farming, mostly of sugarcane. There is a network of cane tramways in the locality.

History 

Isis North Provisional School opened on 29 August 1887. On 1 June 1898 it became Isis North State School. It closed on 13 April 1942.

A sugar mill opened in North Isis on Knockroe Road circa 1894. It had ceased operation before 1931.

Whitebridge State School opened on 1915 and closed on 1921.

In the  North Isis had a population of 533 people.

References 

Bundaberg Region
Localities in Queensland